This is a list of important texts written by Jain ascetics and those which are of important value to Jainism.

Digambara texts 

Ādi purāṇa
Dravyasamgraha
Ratnakaranda śrāvakācāra
Pancastikayasara
 Pravachanasara
Puruşārthasiddhyupāya
 Satkhandagama
 Samayasāra
 Sarvārthasiddhi
Siribhoovalaya
Niyamasara
Jnanarnava
Mahapurana
Mulachara
Tiloya Panatti

Shvetambara texts 
Shvetambara Agamas
Suryaprajnaptisutra

Others

Yogaśāstra
Siddha-Hema-Śabdanuśāśana
Trishashthi-Shalaka-Purusha-Charitra
Bhadrabahu Samhita
Jnanarnava or the Yogapradipadhikara
Pramana-mimansa (logic)

Texts claimed by both the sects 
Tattvartha Sutra- 1st Jain text written in Sanskrit language.

Other texts 
Ajitha purana
Antakrddaasah
Aupapātika
Anuttaraupapātikadaśāh
Atma Siddhi
Aupapatika
Bahuriband
Cīvaka Cintāmaṇi
Drstivada
Jnatrdharmakathah
Kalpa Sūtra
Līlāvatīsāra
Lokavibhaga
Nālaṭiyār
Neelakesi
Nishitha
Nivvāṇalīlāvaīkahā
Prasnavyakaranani
Purvas
Samavayanga Sutra
Acaranga Sutra
Shantinatha Charitra
Silappatikaram
Sthananga Sutra
Sutrakritanga
Upasakadasah
Vaddaradhane
Valayapathi
Varangacharita
Vikramarjuna Vijaya
Vipakasruta
Vyākhyāprajñapti

 
Texts